Bartleson is a surname. Notable people with this surname
Karen Bartleson, American former executive in electronic design automation industry
John Bartleson  a leader of the Bartleson–Bidwell Party, one of the first emigrant parties
C. J. Bartelson, a namesake of the Bartleson–Breneman effect in  perception of contrast by a human observer
Charlie Bartleson, early 20th century football player and coach with Florida Gators, see 1908 Florida football team
Brooke Bartleson, professional wildlife photographer